One Nil, released in 2001, is the second solo album by New Zealand singer-songwriter, Neil Finn.  When released in the United States the following year, the album had a slightly different track listing and was issued under the name One All.

Overview
Following the release of his debut solo effort Try Whistling This in 1998, singer-songwriter Neil Finn followed up by releasing the less adventurous album One Nil in 2001. The album features guest musicians Sheryl Crow, Lisa Germano and Crowded House's album producer Mitchell Froom. The album was released in the United States fourteen months after its initial New Zealand, United Kingdom and Australian release with the altered title One All and also contained an altered track listing, featuring four remixed songs and added the songs "Lullaby Requiem" and "Human Kindness", replacing "Elastic Heart" and "Don't Ask Why".

Track listings
All songs were written by Neil Finn, except where noted.

One Nil
"The Climber" – 4:13
"Rest of the Day Off" (Finn, Wendy Melvoin, Tchad Blake) – 3:49
"Hole in the Ice" (Finn, Lisa Coleman) – 4:11
"Wherever You Are" – 4:46
"Last to Know" (Finn, Melvoin) – 3:02
"Don't Ask Why" (Finn, Melvoin) – 3:54
"Secret God" (Finn, Melvoin) – 5:27
"Turn and Run" – 3:46
"Elastic Heart" – 4:00
"Anytime" – 3:24
"Driving Me Mad" – 3:58
"Into the Sunset" – 4:12

One All
Tracks 1 and 9 ("The Climber" and "Turn and Run") contained an alternative mix to the One Nil version. Tracks 2 and 3 ("Driving Me Mad" and "Hole in the Ice") were remixed by Bob Clearmountain.
"The Climber" (New mix) – 4:15
"Driving Me Mad" (Bob Clearmountain mix) – 3:56
"Hole in the Ice" (Bob Clearmountain mix) – 4:06
"Last to Know" – 2:59
"Wherever You Are" – 4:42
"Secret God" – 5:24
"Lullaby Requiem" – 3:44
"Human Kindness" – 4:41
"Turn and Run" (New mix) – 3:41
"Anytime" – 3:23
"Rest of the Day Off" – 3:57
"Into the Sunset" – 4:12

Personnel
Neil Finn – guitar, vocals, high bass, piano, guitar synthesiser, orchestra bells, Wurlitzer electric piano, vibes, harmonium, bass, Chamberlin strings
Wendy Melvoin – E-Bow fuzz guitar, chorus on "The Climber", drums, low bass, guitar, bass, percussion, backing vocals, shaker
Jim Moginie – ukulele, guitar, fuzz guitar
Lisa Germano – chorus on "The Climber", violin
Suzanna Melvoin – chorus on "The Climber"
Doyle – chorus on "The Climber"
Tchad Blake – Groove box
Mitchell Froom – Penny owsley, keyboards, Hammond organ, Chamberlin, Wurlitzer electric piano, piano, celeste
Lisa Coleman – keyboards, backing vocals
JJ Johnson – drums
Liam Finn – backing vocals
Sharon Finn – backing vocals
Jim Keltner – drums
Edmund McWilliams – backing vocals
Sheryl Crow – vocals, accordion
Sam Gibson – drum programming, programming

Charts

Certifications

Notes

Neil Finn albums
2001 albums
Albums produced by Tchad Blake
Albums produced by Mitchell Froom
Parlophone albums
Albums recorded at Sunset Sound Recorders